Limerick Township is a township in Montgomery County, Pennsylvania, United States.

History
The township was named for the hometown of early settler William Evans, whose family arrived in the area from Limerick, Ireland in 1698.  The township is mentioned in Philadelphia court records in the 1710s, but formal proceedings recording the township's boundaries were not entered until March Sessions 1726. Royersford was created from its southeastern corner in 1879.  Limerick Township is a member of the Spring-Ford Area School District. The township grew from a 1990 population of  6,600 to 18,074 as of the 2010 census. On July 27, 1994, a deadly tornado struck parts of Limerick Township, killing an infant and her parents. The most severely affected area was the Hamlet housing development.

The William and Mordecai Evans House and Isaac Hunsberger House are listed on the National Register of Historic Places.

Geography
According to the United States Census Bureau, the township has a total area of 22.8 square miles (59.0 km2), of which 22.6 square miles (58.5 km2)  is land and 0.2 square mile (0.5 km2)  (0.92%) is water.  The Limerick Nuclear Power Plant is located within its borders, along with Heritage Field Airport. The township is drained by the Schuylkill River, which separates it from Chester County. Its villages include Barlow Heights, Limerick, Linfield, and Neiffer.

The climate is hot-summer humid continental and average monthly temperatures in the village of Limerick range from 30.3 °F in January to 74.8 °F in July. The hardiness zones are 6b and 7a.

Neighboring municipalities
Lower Pottsgrove Township (west)
New Hanover Township (northwest)
Upper Frederick Township (north)
Lower Frederick Township (northeast)
Perkiomen Township (east)
Upper Providence Township (southeast)
Royersford (south)
East Vincent Township, Chester County (southwest)
East Coventry Township, Chester County (southwest)

Demographics

As of the 2010 census, the township was 91.5% White, 3.4% Black or African American, 0.1% Native American, 3.2% Asian, and 1.8% of the population were of Hispanic or Latino ancestry. 1.3% were two or more races. .

As of the census of 2000, there were 13,534 people, 5,143 households, and 3,744 families residing in the township.  The population density was 599.6 people per square mile (231.5/km2).  There were 5,442 housing units at an average density of 241.1/sq mi (93.1/km2).  The racial makeup of the township was 95.10% White, 2.11% African American, 0.19% Native American, 1.29% Asian, 0.44% from other races, and 0.86% from two or more races. Hispanic or Latino of any race were 1.32% of the population.

There were 5,143 households, out of which 37.3% had children under the age of 18 living with them, 62.6% were married couples living together, 6.7% had a female householder with no husband present, and 27.2% were non-families. 21.2% of all households were made up of individuals, and 4.9% had someone living alone who was 65 years of age or older.  The average household size was 2.63 and the average family size was 3.09.

In the township the population was spread out, with 26.8% under the age of 18, 5.4% from 18 to 24, 40.2% from 25 to 44, 19.2% from 45 to 64, and 8.5% who were 65 years of age or older.  The median age was 34 years. For every 100 females there were 98.6 males.  For every 100 females age 18 and over, there were 96.0 males.

The median income for a household in the township was $64,752, and the median income for a family was $73,296. Males had a median income of $46,351 versus $35,275 for females. The per capita income for the township was $27,305.  About 1.3% of families and 1.9% of the population were below the poverty line, including 1.6% of those under age 18 and none of those age 65 or over.

Government and politics

Supervisors
Kenneth W. Sperring Jr. (Chair)
Michael J. McCloskey, III (Vice-Chair)
Patrick M. Morroney 
Kara Shuler 
Linda Irwin

Legislators
US Representative Madeleine Dean, 4th district, Democratic
State Senator Katie Muth, 44th district, Democratic
State Representative Joe Ciresi, 146th district, Democratic

Transportation

U.S. Route 422 is the main highway serving Limerick Township. It follows the Pottstown Expressway along a northwest-southeast alignment across the southwestern portion of the township, with three interchanges providing local access.

SEPTA provides Suburban Bus service to Limerick Township along Route 93, which runs between the Norristown Transportation Center in Norristown and Pottstown and serves the Philadelphia Premium Outlets in the township, and Route 139, which runs between the King of Prussia Transit Center at the King of Prussia mall and Limerick. Pottstown Area Rapid Transit (PART) provides bus service to the Philadelphia Premium Outlets along the Blue Line route, which heads west to Pottstown.

Notable people
In 1890, Joseph F. Buzby, Royersford, Pa., invented a Glass Telephone Insulator that was issued U S Patent # 427,296. A revolution in technology could not be recognized without such an invention.
Bob Shoudt aka Notorious B.O.B. - Competitive Eater holding numerous World Records including eating 59.6 lbs of food and drink in 4 hours at The Reading Phillies Gluttony Night on June 12, 2018

Shopping
The Philadelphia Premium Outlets, along with many other shopping centers have sprouted along with the growing population.

Sister cities 

 Limerick, Ireland

See also
Chapel Christian Academy – former school (1974 - 2007)
Limerick Nuclear Power Plant

References

External links

 Limerick Township
 Limerick Township Historical Society

Townships in Montgomery County, Pennsylvania
1726 establishments in Pennsylvania